The 1975 Primera División season was the 84th season of top-flight football in Argentina. River Plate won both tournaments. None of the teams were relegated.

Metropolitano Championship

Nacional Championship

Group A

Group B

Group C

Group D

Final Tournament

References

Argentine Primera División seasons
Argentine Primera Division
Primera Division